The Young Graduates is a 1971 American drama film directed by Robert Anderson, and starring Patricia Wymer, Steven Stewart, Gary Rist, Bruno Kirby, Jennifer Ritt, Dennis Christopher and Marly Holiday. The film was released by Crown International Pictures on June 2, 1971.

Plot
Spunky and precocious high school senior Mindy Evans spurns her decent, but frustrated boyfriend Bill and has a fling with teacher Jack Thompson, a hunky nice guy that's married. Mindy finds out that she might be pregnant. While waiting for the results of her pregnancy test, Mindy decides to alleviate the tension by embarking on an impromptu road trip to Big Sur, California with her best girl friend Sandy.

Cast
Patricia Wymer as Mindy Evans
Steven Stewart as Jack Thompson
Gary Rist as Bill
Bruno Kirby as Les
Jennifer Ritt as Gretchen Thompson
Dennis Christopher as Pan
Marly Holiday as Sandy
Anthony Mannino
Robert Almanza as Danny
Joe Pepe as Lieutenant
Max Manning as Bartender
Frances Tremaine as Teacher
Tom Benko as Reporter
Pat Russell as And Spare Change

References

External links

1970s coming-of-age drama films
1971 drama films
1970s drama road movies
1970s teen drama films
1971 films
American coming-of-age drama films
American drama road movies
Crown International Pictures films
1970s English-language films
Films set in California
Juvenile sexuality in films
1970s American films